Eureka is a mining ghost town in San Juan County, Colorado, United States, along the Animas River, between Silverton and Animas Forks. The town derives its name from the Greek interjection Eureka!

History

Charles Baker's group of prospectors found traces of placer gold in the San Juan Mountains in 1860 at Eureka.  Forced out by the Ute Tribe in 1861, who had been awarded the area in a US treaty, the prospectors returned in 1871, when lode gold was found in the Little Giant vein at Arrastre Gulch near Silverton, Colorado.  The miners were allowed to stay after the Brunot Treaty of 13 Sept. 1873.  In exchange for giving up 4 million acres, the Southern Ute Indian Reservation received $25,000 per year.

By 1875, Eureka had a post office.  The original mill was closed (reasons unknown) but to replace it, the Gold Prince Mill from Animas Forks was deconstructed and moved
to the Eureka townsite to become the Sunnyside mill.  In 1896, Eureka was connected to the Denver and Rio Grande Railroad via the Silverton Northern Railroad.  Although the community grew steadily — not like a boomtown — it quickly declined after 1939, when the Sunnyside Mill closed for the last time.  Today, the original townsite gravel roads remain, and debris litters the area.  The only remaining structure is the Eureka jail, which has been restored.  Foundations of the Sunnyside Mill and various remains of other structures still exist today.

Geography

See also

 List of ghost towns in Colorado

References

External links

 Eureka Ghost Town, Historic Site Photos by Coloradopast.com

Former populated places in San Juan County, Colorado
Ghost towns in Colorado